Joseph Fels Ritt (August 23, 1893 – January 5, 1951) was an American mathematician at Columbia University in the early 20th century. He was born and died in New York.

After beginning his undergraduate studies at City College of New York, Ritt received his B.A. from George Washington University in 1913. He then earned a doctorate in mathematics from Columbia University in 1917 under the supervision of Edward Kasner. After doing calculations for the war effort in World War I, he joined the Columbia faculty in 1921. He served as department chair from 1942 to 1945, and in 1945 became the Davies Professor of Mathematics. In 1932, George Washington University honored him with a Doctorate in Science,  and in 1933 he was elected to join the United States National Academy of Sciences. He has 463 academic descendants listed in the Mathematics Genealogy Project, mostly through his student Ellis Kolchin. Ritt was an Invited Speaker with talk Elementary functions and their inverses at the ICM in 1924 in Toronto and a Plenary Speaker at the ICM in 1950 in Cambridge, Massachusetts.

Ritt founded differential algebra theory, which was subsequently much developed by him and his student Ellis Kolchin.

He is known for his work on characterizing the indefinite integrals that can be solved in closed form, for his work on the theory of ordinary differential equations and partial differential equations, for beginning the study of differential algebraic groups, and for the method of characteristic sets used in the solution of systems of polynomial equations.

Despite his great achievements, he was never awarded any prize for his work, a fact which he resented, as he felt he was underappreciated. He once composed the following epitaph for himself:

Here at your feet J. F. Ritt lies;
He never won the Bôcher prize.

Selected works
 Differential equations from the algebraic standpoint, New York, American Mathematical Society 1932
 Theory of Functions, New York 1945, 1947
 Integration in finite terms: Liouville's Theory of Elementary Methods, Columbia University Press 1948
 Differential Algebra, American Mathematical Society 1950, Dover 1966

See also
Ritt characteristic set
Ritt theorem
Ritt's polynomial decomposition theorem

References

1893 births
1951 deaths
20th-century American mathematicians
Members of the United States National Academy of Sciences
Columbia University alumni
Columbia University faculty